This is a List of members of the Old Southportonians Association being notable old boys of the Anglican The Southport School, in , Queensland, Australia. The Old Southportonians Association (OSA) is the alumni organisation for Old Boys of the school. The OSA celebrated its 100 years as a recognised body in 2007.

Arts, media and sciences
 James Blundell – singer
 Sidney Cotton – inventor of the 'Sidcot' flight suit
 Ben Dark – television presenter, Getaway, Nine Network
 Sir Lorimer Dods – founder of the Children's Medical Research Institute
 Stewart Morris – singer, member of the Ten Tenors
 Paul Whittaker – Editor-in-Chief, The Australian
 Rod Young – news anchor for Seven Network

Business and politics
 Rob Borbidge – Premier of Queensland
 John Moore – former Federal Liberal Defence Minister
 Bill O'Chee – Queensland Senator
 Glen Sheil – Queensland Senator
  Paul Whittaker - CEO Sky News Australia

Military
 General Sir Arthur MacDonald – Chief of Defence Force Staff (1977–1979)
 Lieutenant General Robert Harold Nimmo – head of UN Military Observer Group in Pakistan and India (1952–1966)
 Vice Admiral Sir David Stevenson – Chief of Naval Staff (1973–1976)
 Air Vice Marshal Darren Goldie - Air Commander Australia (2022- )

Sport

 Chris Atkinson, a World Rally Championship
 Courtney Atkinson, an Australian triathlete
 Andrew Baildon, an Australian swimmer
Shaun Barry, a rugby union player with Queensland Reds
 Mathew Belcher, an Australian sailor
 Gregory Brough, an Australian swimmer
 Adam Brown, a British swimmer
 Caleb Brown, a rugby union player with the Queensland Reds
Eddie Broad, a rugby union player for Queensland and Australia
 Vitori Buatava, a rugby union player with the Fiji national rugby union team
 John Buchanan, an Australian cricket player
 Jarrad Butler, a rugby union player with the Queensland Reds and ACT Brumbies
Jock Campbell, a rugby union player for the Queensland Reds
 Richard Charlesworth, a British swimmer
David Duley, a rugby union player for the Queensland Reds
 Trent Durrington, a baseball player for the Anaheim Angels
 Caine Eckstein, an ironman at the Northcliff Surf Life Saving Club
 Shannon Eckstein, an ironman at the Northcliff Surf Life Saving Club
 Nathan Eyres-Brown, a rugby union player with the Queensland Reds
 Duncan Free, an Australian rower
 Wally Fullerton-Smith, a rugby league player with the Queensland State of Origin Team
 Josh Graham, a rugby union player for Queensland Reds and a Rugby league player for the Gold Coast Titans
 Nathan Grey, a rugby union player for Australia and the New South Wales Waratahs
 Scott Higginbotham, a rugby union player with the Wallabies, the Queensland Reds, the Rebels, and the NEC Green Rockets
 Peter Jackson, a rugby league player with the Queensland State of Origin Team and Australian Rugby League Team
 Lloyd Johansson, a rugby union player with the Wallabies and the Queensland Reds
 Clark Keating, an Australian rules football for the Brisbane Lions
 Matt Kuhnemann , an Australian cricketer
 Jono Lance, a rugby union player with the Queensland Reds, the NSW Waratahs, and Western Force
Charles Que Fong Lee, a rugby union player for Queensland #462
Tom Lawton, a rugby union player with Queensland & the Wallabies
Robert Lawton, a rugby union player with Queensland, Highlanders & the Wallabies
 Marco Loughran, a British swimmer
 Leigh McBean, an Australian swimmer
 Broc McCauley, an Australian rules football for the Brisbane Lions
 Griffin McMaster, a soccer player with the Brisbane Roar
 Marcus Marshall, a V8 Supercar driver
 Luke Morahan, a rugby union player with the Wallabies, the Queensland Reds and Western Force
 Brad Moran, Australian rules footballer for the Adelaide Crows 
 Scott Muller, an Australian cricketer
 Peter Norman an Australian sprinter who protested Australia's racist policies in the 1968 Olympics Black Power salute alongside John Carlos and Tommie Smith
 Patrick Murtagh, an Australian rules footballer for the Gold Coast Suns
 Bill O'Chee, an Australian skeleton player (also see politician)
 Daniel Ritchie, a British rower
 Mat Rogers, a rugby league and rugby union player with the Gold Coast Titans, the Australian Kangaroos, and the New South Wales Waratahs
Roger Salter, a rugby union player for Queensland #520
 Adam Scott, a golf player on the PGA Tour
 UJ Seuteni, a rugby union player with Toulon and Oyonnax
 Nathan Sharpe, a rugby union player with the Wallabies, the Queensland Reds and Western Force
Ainslie Glenister Ross Sheil, a rugby union player for the Wallabies #415 and Queensland #635
Glenister Sheil, a rugby union player for Queensland #646
James Slipper, a rugby union player with the Wallabies and the Queensland Reds
Rob Simmons, a rugby union player with the Wallabies and the Queensland Reds
Billy Stanlake, an Australian cricketer
Nathan Stapleton, a rugby league player with the Cronulla Sharks
 Lausii Taliauli, a rugby union player with the Brumbies
Ben Tapuai, a rugby union player with the Wallabies, the Queensland Reds, and Western Force
Blair Tickner, a New Zealand cricketer
Bernard Tomic, an Australian tennis player
Grant Turner, a British swimmer
John Wolfe, a rugby union player for the Wallabies (uncapped) and Queensland #760
Noah Lolesio, a rugby union player with ACT Brumbies & the Wallabies
Zane Nonggorr, a rugby union player with Queensland Reds

References

External links
 The Southport School website

Lists of people educated in Queensland by school affiliation
Great Public Schools Association of Queensland
Southport School Old Boys'
Lists of Australian men
 *